Janet Lesley Bayly (born 1955) is a New Zealand photographer, museum director and curator and is an authority on the works of Frances Hodgkins. Her photographic works are held in the permanent collections of the Museum of New Zealand Te Papa Tongarewa, the Christchurch Art Gallery, and the Sarjeant Gallery.

Bayly was born in Tauranga in 1955 and was educated at Hutt Valley High School and then Elam School of Fine Arts. She completed her bachelor's degree in 1976 and obtained her master's degree in 1979.

As at February 2021, Bayly is the director of the Mahara Gallery, the district public gallery for the Kapiti Coast.

References 

1955 births
Living people
New Zealand photographers
New Zealand women photographers
People from Tauranga